Denmark competed at the 2015 World Aquatics Championships in Kazan, Russia from 24 July to 9 August 2015.

Medalists

Swimming
Danish swimmers have achieved qualifying standards in the following events (up to a maximum of 2 swimmers in each event at the A-standard entry time, and 1 at the B-standard):

Eleven of these swimmers have been nominated to compete for Denmark at the World Championships, including current world record holder Rikke Møller Pedersen in the 200 m breaststroke, 2008 Olympic bronze medalist Lotte Friis in long-distance freestyle, and three-time Olympian and defending World champion Jeanette Ottesen in the 50 m butterfly.

Men

Women

References

External links
Danish Swimming Federation 

Nations at the 2015 World Aquatics Championships
2015 in Danish sport
Denmark at the World Aquatics Championships